James Lewis Seymour (born 13 March 1992) is an Australian cricketer. He made his first-class debut on 3 April 2021, for Victoria in the 2020–21 Sheffield Shield season. He made his List A debut on 8 April 2021, for Victoria in the 2020–21 Marsh One-Day Cup. In November 2021, in the 2021–22 Sheffield Shield season, Seymour scored his maiden century in first-class cricket. He made his Twenty20 debut on 7 December 2021, for the Melbourne Renegades in the 2021–22 Big Bash League season.

References

External links
 

1992 births
Living people
Australian cricketers
Victoria cricketers
Melbourne Renegades cricketers
Place of birth missing (living people)